Tanner Williams is an unincorporated community in Mobile County, Alabama, United States.

History
Tanner Williams is named after two local landowners. The Tanner Williams School, which is no longer in use, was first opened in 1914.

References

Unincorporated communities in Mobile County, Alabama
Unincorporated communities in Alabama